The term connection line refers to a rail line whose principal purpose is to connect other lines. Specifically it may refer, amongst others, to:

 The Chrystie Street Connection, a New York Subway line on the Lower East Side of Manhattan, New York
 The Lehigh Line Connection, a rail line that connects Amtrak's Northeast Corridor with the Conrail Lehigh Line near Newark, New Jersey
 The Montclair Connection, a rail line on the NJ Transit Rail Operations system in New Jersey
 The North–South connection, a rail line through the centre of Brussels, Belgium, is not a connection line properly speaking, but a main railway line in its own right
 The , a rail line that connects the north and south of Stockholm, Sweden
 The Wairarapa Connection, an interurban commuter rail line in New Zealand
 The 60th Street Tunnel Connection, a line of the New York Subway connecting the 60th Street Tunnel with the IND Queens Boulevard Line in Queens, New York